Gustavo Guerrero (born 22 October 1959) is a former professional tennis player from Argentina.

Career
Guerro competed in five French Opens. He lost to Rod Frawley in the first round of the 1981 French Open and then to another Australian, Paul McNamee, in the 1984 French Open opening round. His only Grand Slam win was in the men's doubles at the 1986 French Open, where he and Spaniard Jose Clavet beat Eddie Edwards and Francisco González, before being eliminated in the second round.

The Argentine was a semi-finalist at the Brussels Outdoor tournament in 1980, securing wins over Helmar Stiegler, Mike Cahill and Andreas Maurer.

Challenger titles

Singles: (1)

Doubles: (5)

References

1959 births
Living people
Argentine male tennis players
Tennis players from Buenos Aires